The 2016 South Dakota Republican presidential primary was held on June 7 in the U.S. state of South Dakota as one of the Republican Party's primaries ahead of the 2016 presidential election.

The Republican Party's primaries in California, Montana, New Jersey and New Mexico were held the same day. The Democratic primaries in the same five states happened concurrently, including the South Dakota Democratic primary.

Results

Results by county

See also

 2016 South Dakota Democratic presidential primary

References

South Dakota
Republican primary
South Dakota Republican primaries